Powerhouse Animation Studios, Inc. is an American animation studio based in Austin, Texas. It was founded in April 2001 with a subsidiary called Powerhouse Animation LLC, established in summer of 2014. The company develops and produces traditional 2D animation, motion comics, motion graphics, art assets, digital paint, illustration for television series, motion pictures, video game cinemas, commercials, advertising campaigns, educational properties, and entertainment companies.

History
Headquartered in Austin, TX, Powerhouse Animation was founded on April 1, 2001, as a privately held animation service studio by Frank Gabriel, Brad Graeber, and Bruce Tinnin.

Powerhouse Animation's name is partially inspired by Raymond Scott's song "Powerhouse," which was often placed in scores that Carl Stalling wrote for Warner Bros. shorts and has been featured in numerous animated cartoons.  Powerhouse's motto is: "To better humanity through the miracle of traditional animation and space-age multimedia technology; promote truth, justice, and capitalism through cartoons."

In the fall of 2014, Powerhouse Animation Studios, Inc. opened its first satellite office in Burbank, CA.

Powerhouse Animation LLC, a division of parent company Powerhouse, joined The Animation Guild and became a Signatory of IATSE (International Alliance of Theatrical and Stage Employees) in May 2015.

In 2021, Powerhouse signed a first-look deal with Netflix to produce new animated shows for them.

Projects
In 2002, Powerhouse produced the short "Heroes" which parodied the film Clerks as well as Marvel Comics characters. After seeing the short, Kevin Smith, the director of Clerks, contacted the firm to produce an unfinished commercial from Dogma. After producing the short, Smith hired Powerhouse to create an arcade machine that featured a custom video game. The game was given, as a wrap party present, to Ben Affleck and Jennifer Lopez for their work on Jersey Girl. In the game, the main character is Lopez trying to rescue Affleck from an unknown villain and a band of ninjas. The player fights several bosses, including a robotic Matt Damon and finally Smith himself.

In 2003, the firm created a 35 mm test for a feature film based on Clerks: The Animated Series for Smith. They animated Clerks: The Lost Scene which was included on the Clerks X: 10th Anniversary DVD. As writerdirector Smith explains in the introduction to the scene on the DVD, it had originally been written for Clerks, but was not filmed due to budgetary restraints. The short was named the "best bonus feature of 2004" by Rolling Stone magazine.

In 2004, they animated the "Mr. Mom" video for the band Lonestar. In 2008, they worked with Hothead Games to produce mini-games and cinemas for the video game Penny Arcade: On the Rain Slick Precipice of Darkness. In 2010, they created in-game animation and cinemas for the game RISK: Factions produced by Electronic Arts and Hasbro.

The firm produces animated versions of many syndicated comic strips including Dilbert, Pearls before Swine, Cul de Sac, Lio, Pooch Café and Over the Hedge produced by RingTales.  Powerhouse has animated over 300 Dilbert shorts. It has produced animated content for educational companies including TED-Ed, Brain Chase, Compass Learning, Ignite! Learning and the National Fire Protection Association.

It produces animated content for websites, podcasts and other internet companies including several segments of the "B.S. Report Animated Archives" and "Jalen Rose Story Time" for ESPN's Grantland, and episodes of Kevin Smith's Spoilers series for SModcast and Hulu.  It has created animated video games cinematics for AAA console titles and iOS games such as Mortal Kombat X, Epic Mickey and Epic Mickey 2, DC Universe Online, Darksiders 2, Starhawk, The Banner Saga, W.A.R.P., Avengers Initiative, Grey Goo, Disney's Hidden Worlds, Man of Steel and others.

In November 2013, Powerhouse worked with Disney Interactive and Disney Television Animation with collaboration by language instruction company Rosetta Stone to create a nine-episode season of It's a Small World: The Animated Series, Based on the Disney Parks attraction, It's a Small World.

Powerhouse has produced animated advertising content for brands such as Old Spice, IAMS, Disney Parks, Disneyland, Metlife, Coca-Cola, Oreo, Mountain Dew, Ruffles, GoDaddy.com and many others. In 2015, they worked with Weiden+Kennedy to animate a segment for a Weight Watchers ad called "All You Can Eat" that aired during Super Bowl XLIX.

Powerhouse has produced animated music videos for Lizzo, The Pains of Being Pure at Heart, Wale ft. French Montana, A Sound of Thunder and Lonestar. The firm also develops original IPs and has optioned a series to a toy company. In 2015, the company wrote, created, designed and voiced a short series for Awesomeness/DreamWorksTV called Advice Times with Grandpa Theo that can be seen on DreamWorksTV's YouTube page. In 2017, the firm worked on numerous cutscenes featured in the action-adventure game Agents of Mayhem.

From 2017 to 2021, Powerhouse Animation Studios worked on the Netflix animated series, Castlevania, written by Warren Ellis; produced by Frederator Studios and Adi Shankar. Castlevania aired July 7, 2017, on Netflix.

Powerhouse work on a Greek mythologybased anime-influenced animation series titled Blood of Zeus, released on Netflix in March 2019.

In August 2019, it was announced Powerhouse would be working on Masters of the Universe: Revelation for Netflix. It will serve as a sequel series to the original He-Man and the Masters of the Universe. In late October 2019, "Heaven's Forest" was announced and will be set in an Indo-futuristic world, inspired from the Indian epic Ramayana.

In late June 2021, the studio signed a first look deal with Netflix.

October 2, 2021: the studio worked with OfflineTV to create an animated music video called "Break Out".

October 5, 2021: Powerhouse Animation worked with Sega to release a launch trailer for Super Monkey Ball: Banana Mania.

October 11, 2022: Mark Phillips of RDCWorld1 announced that their new animated show, Dark Lights, is being animated by Powerhouse Animation.

November 1, 2022: the Sonic Frontiers promotional short "Sonic Frontiers Prologue: Divergence" was released, featuring animation by Powerhouse Animation.

Commercials
Coca-Cola 
Disney Parks
Disneyland
Cartoon Network
Nickelodeon
Disney Channel
Disney Junior
GoDaddy.com
IAMS
Metlife
Mountain Dew
Old Spice
Oreo
Qubo
Riddlin' Kids
Ruffles
Disney Cruise Line
Royal Caribbean International
Carnival Cruise Line

Video games
Penny Arcade: On the Rain Slick Precipice of Darkness (2008–2013)
RISK: Factions (2010)
Epic Mickey (2010)
DC Universe Online (2011)
W.A.R.P. (2012)
Starhawk (2012)
Darksiders II (2012)
Epic Mickey 2: The Power of Two (2012)
Disney's Hidden Worlds (2013)
Dead Island: Retro Revenge (2016)
A King's Tale: Final Fantasy XV (2016)
The Banner Saga (2014–2018)
Avengers Initiative (2014)
Grey Goo (2015)
Mortal Kombat X (2015)
Agents of Mayhem (2017)
Super Monkey Ball Banana Mania (2021)
Sonic Origins (2022)

TV series

Adult animation
 Castlevania (2017–2021)
 Seis Manos (2019)
 Blood of Zeus (2020–present)
 Masters of the Universe: Revelation (2021–present)

Kids & family
 It's a Small World: The Animated Series (20132014)
 Henry Danger Motion Comic (2015)
 OK K.O.! Let's Be Heroes (2017–2019)
 The Adventures of Kid Danger (2018)
 Epithet Erased (2019)
 Santiago of the Seas (2020–present)

Upcoming
Heaven's Forest (TBA)
 Skull Island (TBA)
 Tomb Raider (TBA)
 Castlevania: Nocturne (TBA)
 Dark Lights (TBA)

Films
Jasper shorts (2010–2012)
QT8: The First Eight (2019; animated segments)

References

External links 
 http://www.powerhouseanimation.com
 https://www.videojeeves.com/

American animation studios
Companies based in Austin, Texas
American companies established in 2001
Mass media companies established in 2001
2001 establishments in Texas